Bjelovac is a village in the municipality of Bratunac, Bosnia and Herzegovina.

History
Forces of the Army of the Republic of Bosnia and Herzegovina killed 109 Serbs in the village in December 1992, during the Bosnian War. Among the victims were 54 women and 12 children.

References

Villages in Republika Srpska
Populated places in Bratunac